Shipunovsky (masculine), Shipunovskaya (feminine), or Shipunovskoye (neuter) may refer to:
Shipunovsky District, a district of Altai Krai, Russia
Shipunovsky (rural locality), a rural locality (a settlement) in Novosibirsk Oblast, Russia